Erdbach is a small river of Hesse, Germany. It flows into the Mümling near Michelstadt.

See also

List of rivers of Hesse

Rivers of Hesse
Rivers of Germany